Pool C of the 2023 Rugby World Cup will begin on 9 September 2023. The pool includes two-times Champions Australia, and previous two tournament oppositions Wales and Fiji. They are joined by Georgia (Europe 1) and Portugal (Final Qualifier Winner).

Teams

Notes

Standings

Matches

Australia vs Georgia

Wales vs Fiji

Wales vs Portugal

Notes:
This is the first ever meeting between these two sides at a World Cup.

Australia vs Fiji

Georgia vs Portugal

Notes:
This is the first ever meeting between these two sides at a World Cup.

Wales vs Australia

Fiji vs Georgia

Australia vs Portugal

Notes:
This is the first ever meeting between these two sides at a World Cup.

Wales vs Georgia

Fiji vs Portugal

Notes:
This is the first ever meeting between these two sides at a World Cup.

References

Pool B